"Jump" is a song by the Japanese J-pop group Every Little Thing, released as their 20th single on October 17, 2001. It is their first song composed by Kaori Mochida.

Track listing
 Jump (Words & music - Kaori Mochida)
 Jump (Cubismo Graphico mix)
 Jump (iInstrumental)

Chart positions

External links
 "Jump" information at Avex Network.
 "Jump" information at Oricon.

2001 singles
Every Little Thing (band) songs
Songs written by Kaori Mochida
2001 songs
Avex Trax singles